The 2019 Kentucky gubernatorial election took place on November 5, 2019, to elect the governor and lieutenant governor of Kentucky. The Democratic nominee, Kentucky Attorney General Andy Beshear, defeated Republican incumbent Matt Bevin by just over 5,000 votes, or 0.37%, making this the closest gubernatorial election in Kentucky since 1899 by total votes, and the closest ever by percentage. It was also the closest race of the 2019 gubernatorial election cycle.

Beshear won by 0.37 percentage points, receiving 49.20% of the vote to Bevin's 48.83%. Bevin won 97 counties, while Beshear won 23 counties.  Beshear also carried only two of the state's six congressional districts, but those districts were the state's two most urbanized, the Louisville-based 3rd and the Lexington-based 6th.

Beshear won with overwhelming support in Louisville and Lexington, Kentucky's two main population hubs, and their suburbs, as well as major vote swings in the Republican-leaning Cincinnati suburbs and lackluster performance by Bevin in counties that had swung heavily towards Republicans, particularly the coal country of Eastern Kentucky, where Beshear won multiple counties that overwhelmingly voted Republican in 2016, but were traditionally Democratic. Voter turnout was high across the state compared to past Kentucky elections, with a statewide turnout of about 42%. Fayette County (Lexington) saw a 20% increase in voter turnout, and Beshear received over twice as many votes in the county than the 2015 Democratic nominee for governor, Jack Conway. Unusually high turnout was seen as a major factor in Beshear's win.

Beshear's win coincided with Democratic momentum nationwide in elections in 2017, 2018, and 2019, following the election of Donald Trump in 2016. However, Republicans won all other statewide offices in Kentucky, including the attorney general and secretary of state offices which Democrats held going into the election.

Bevin conceded on November 14, after a recanvass took place that day that did not change the vote count. Libertarian John Hicks also qualified for the ballot and received 2% of the vote. Statewide turnout was just over 42%, much higher than for the 2015 gubernatorial election.

Background
Major-party primary elections occurred on May 21, 2019. Incumbent  Republican Governor Matt Bevin was renominated by the Republican Party. Kentucky Attorney General Andy Beshear won the Democratic nomination with 37.9% of the vote in a three-way contest, in which due to his father he had the greatest name recognition.

Bevin announced on January 25, 2019, that he would run for a second term, choosing State Senator Ralph Alvarado as his running mate over incumbent Lieutenant Governor Jenean Hampton. No Republican governor of Kentucky has ever been elected to more than one term, even after the state's constitutional prohibition of governors serving consecutive terms was repealed in 1992. The only Republican before Bevin to run for reelection, Ernie Fletcher, was defeated by Democrat Steve Beshear in 2007 (Steve Beshear is the father of Bevin's Democratic challenger, Andy). Bevin was the second Republican governor of Kentucky in the last 50 years. Andy Beshear was the first governor of Kentucky to be a direct relative of a former governor.

Beshear had the support of 2020 Senate candidate Amy McGrath, his father and former governor Steve Beshear, former governor Paul Patton, and representative and primary challenger Rocky Adkins, all well-known Democrats in the state. Bevin had the support of President Donald Trump, who remained relatively popular in the state, particularly in rural areas. Trump and US Senator Rand Paul held a rally in support of Bevin and Republican Attorney General nominee Daniel Cameron the day before the election. Many considered the decisive factor in this election whether voters would vote based on local issues, as Bevin and his policies were deeply unpopular, or as a referendum on Trump, with whom Bevin closely aligned. The former would be more favorable for Democrats, the latter for Republicans.

Bevin was the least popular governor in the United States, with a 33% approval rating in April 2019.

Recanvassing 
Beshear declared victory after the initial vote count, selecting J. Michael Brown to lead his transition team. Bevin refused to concede and requested a recanvassing of the vote, which took place on November 14. A recanvassing is a reprint of the voting receipts from each voting machine and is done to make sure county officials recorded vote totals correctly. It is not a recount, which the Kentucky State Constitution does not permit for gubernatorial races. The recanvass resulted in only one change, an additional vote for Independent candidate Blackii Effing Whyte, and Bevin conceded that day.

Republican primary

Candidates

Nominated
Matt Bevin, incumbent Governor of Kentucky
Running mate: Ralph Alvarado, state senator

Eliminated in primary
Robert Goforth, state representative
Running mate: Mike Hogan, Lawrence County attorney
Ike Lawrence, candidate for mayor of Lexington in 2018
Running mate: James Anthony Rose, semi-retired
William Woods, candidate for the 66th district in the Kentucky House of Representatives in 2012
Running mate: Justin Miller, mathematics and middle grades educator

Declined
 James Comer, incumbent U.S. Representative and candidate for Governor of Kentucky in 2015

Endorsements

Polling

Results

Democratic primary

Candidates

Nominated
Andy Beshear, Attorney General of Kentucky and son of former Governor Steve Beshear
Running mate: Jacqueline Coleman, founder and president of Lead Kentucky, a non-profit organization focused on education policy reform

Eliminated in primary
Rocky Adkins, minority leader of the Kentucky House of Representatives
Running mate: Stephanie Horne, former member of the Jefferson County Board of Education for the 3rd district
Adam Edelen, former Auditor of Public Accounts of Kentucky
Running mate: Gill Holland, filmmaker and urban developer
Geoff Young, perennial candidate, retired engineer, candidate for Governor of Kentucky in 2015, candidate for Kentucky's 6th congressional district in 2014, 2016 and 2018, and Green Party nominee for the 45th district in the Kentucky House of Representatives in 2012
Running mate: Joshua N. French

Declined
Alison Lundergan Grimes, Secretary of State of Kentucky and nominee for the U.S. Senate in 2014
Amy McGrath, retired U.S. Marine and Democratic nominee for Kentucky's 6th congressional district in 2018 (running for U.S. Senate against incumbent Mitch McConnell)
Attica Scott, state representative and former Louisville city councilwoman

Endorsements

Polling

Results

Other candidates

Libertarian Convention
The Libertarian Party of Kentucky is currently recognized as a "political organization" under state law, a status that grants the party ballot access, but denies it a state-operated primary. Libertarian candidates were nominated at the party's nominating convention, held in March 2019.

Nominated
John Hicks, IT consultant
Running mate: Ann Cormican, factory worker

Write-in
Declared
 Amy Husk (Socialist Workers Party), medical assistant and trade unionist
 Running mate: Samir Hazboun, journalist
 Blackii Effing Whyte

General election
Losing by a margin of less than 0.4 percentage points, Bevin did not immediately concede and requested a recanvass, or review of counted votes, which was held on November 14. According to the Kentucky state constitution, the swearing in of a Kentucky governor must be held on the fifth Tuesday following the election (December 10). While a recount law does exist in Kentucky, it does not permit recounts for gubernatorial elections. Should a candidate contest the election results, the state legislature would determine the winner after hearing a report from a randomly selected 11-member committee from the House (8) and Senate (3). This process, which is enforced through the Goebel Election Law, has only been used once, during the 1899 Kentucky gubernatorial election. Kentucky Senate President Robert Stivers and some other Republican members of the Kentucky state legislature expressed skepticism of Bevin's voter fraud claims and on November 7 urged Bevin to concede if the recanvass did not go in his favor. On November 11, U.S. Senate Majority Leader Mitch McConnell, a Kentucky Republican, announced that "all indications are" Beshear would be the next governor. The recanvass did not result in any changes in the vote totals for either Beshear or Bevin, but found an additional vote for write-in candidate Blackii Effing Whyte.

With the recanvass producing no change in his vote total, Bevin conceded the race on November 14. Beshear was sworn in as governor on December 10, 2019.

Predictions

Debates

Endorsements

Polling
Graphical summary

with Rocky Adkins

with Alison Lundergan Grimes

with generic Democrat

Results

Results by congressional district
Beshear won despite carrying only two of the state's six congressional districts, swamping Bevin in the 3rd and 6th districts, which encompass Kentucky's two urban centers, Louisville and Lexington, and their close-in suburbs. Bevin won the 1st, 2nd, 4th, and 5th districts, which represent the more rural areas of the state.

Results by county
Bevin carried 97 of Kentucky's 120 counties. However, Beshear swamped Bevin in urban areas. Beshear carried the state's two largest counties, Jefferson and Fayette–home to Louisville and Lexington, respectively–with over 60 percent of the vote. He also narrowly carried two of the three counties that make up the traditionally conservative Cincinnati suburbs, Kenton and Campbell.

See also
2019 United States gubernatorial elections
2019 United States elections
2019 Kentucky elections
2019 Kentucky Attorney General election

Notes

Partisan clients

References

External links
Official campaign websites
 Andy Beshear (D) for Governor
 Matt Bevin (R) for Governor
 John Hicks (L) for Governor

State government websites
 Kentucky.gov
 Constitution of Kentucky

gubernatorial
2019
November 2019 events in the United States
Kentucky